Dumont is a Canadian news television program, which launched in fall 2009 on V, and ran through 2012. Airing weekdays at 5 p.m. with the title Dumont 360 in its first season, the program moved to 10:30 p.m. and adopted the Dumont title in fall 2010, after the network cancelled its sports talk series L'Attaque à 5.

Hosted by Mario Dumont, a former politician, the show was a news and interview series. The series was produced by La Presse Télé, the television production arm of Montreal newspaper La Presse. It ended its run on V in 2012, after Dumont left the network to join LCN, although Dumont remains the title of his LCN series .

References

External links
 Dumont 360 

2000s Canadian television news shows
2010s Canadian television news shows
2009 Canadian television series debuts
2020s Canadian television news shows
Television shows filmed in Montreal
Noovo original programming